Richard Miranda (born March 6, 1956) is a former Democratic member of the Arizona Senate, representing the 13th District from 2002 to 2011. Previously, he was a member of the Arizona House of Representatives from 1999 through 2002.

In February 2012, Miranda resigned from the Arizona legislature citing health and family issues. In March 2012, he pleaded guilty to wire fraud and tax evasion for stealing $250,000 from a charity which he ran. On June 4, he was sentenced to 27 months in federal prison and will have to pay back the hundreds of thousands of dollars he stole from two non-profit organizations.

References

External links

 Arizona State Legislature – Senator Richard Miranda
 Project Vote Smart – Senator Richard Miranda (AZ) profile
 Follow the Money – Richard Miranda
 2006 2004 2002 2000 1998 campaign contributions

Democratic Party Arizona state senators
Democratic Party members of the Arizona House of Representatives
1956 births
Living people
American politicians convicted of fraud
American people convicted of tax crimes
Arizona politicians convicted of crimes